The Midwest Cities Lacrosse Conference (MCLC) is a senior/post-collegiate men's field lacrosse league based in the Midwestern United States. The MCLC was founded in 1990 as a merger between the "City Division" of the Midwest Club Lacrosse Association and the three-year-old Midwest Club Championship invitational tournament.

Teams are divided into east and west divisions based on their geographic location. Like most other lacrosse leagues, the MCLC plays its games during the Spring. Each season the top teams from the league meet in the playoffs to battle for the MCLC Championship.

Teams

East Division

West Division

Defunct teams

Champions

References

External links 
MCLC website

Team links
 Cincinnati Lacrosse Club
 Cleveland Lacrosse Club
 Motor City Lacrosse Club
 Minnesota Lakers Lacrosse Club
 Minnesota Premium Lacrosse Club
 Pittsburgh Lacrosse Club
 Sr. Gophers Lacrosse Club

Lacrosse leagues in the United States